David Li Lee (born 1949) is a Taiwanese-American business executive and venture capitalist, best known as a co-founder of Global Crossing Ltd.

Education
Lee is a graduate of McGill University. He received a Ph.D. in theoretical physics from Caltech in 1974, with Kip S. Thorne as his advisor, with a minor in economics.  His thesis work was on alternative theories of gravity to Einstein's General Theory of Relativity; he is co-author of the Lightman-Lee and Lee-Lightman-Ni theories of gravity (see Alternatives to General Relativity).

Career
Lee, also a certified public accountant, started his business career at Arthur Andersen & Co. in Los Angeles in 1975. In 1981, he joined a company that was acquired by the satellite communications firm Comsat, where he held a variety of executive positions before joining TRW Information Systems Group in 1986. At TRW, he was group vice president of finance and acquisitions.

Lee left TRW in late 1989 to join Pacific Capital Group, where he facilitated the firm's expansion into the telecommunications industry. He co-founded the transcontinental telecommunications firm Global Crossing in 1997 and served as its president and chief operating officer until early 2000, when he left to launch Clarity Partners with Barry Porter, Steve Rader and R. Rudolph Reinfrank.

In 1999 Lee donated $10 million to Caltech to fund a virtual center in advanced networking, also making a similar donation to Chiao-Tung University, in Taiwan, to fund a sister program.  He is Chairman of the Board of Overseers of the University of Southern California medical school, a trustee of the J. Paul Getty Trust, and Chair of the Board of Trustees of the California Institute of Technology.

References

External links
 Forbes.com, profile of David Lee
 Annette Moore, "David Lee Elected to USC Board" USC News (February 15, 2007)
 California Institute of Technology, Lee Center for Advanced Networking, "David Lee"

Living people
American venture capitalists
American people of Taiwanese descent
1950 births
McGill University alumni
California Institute of Technology alumni
Members of Committee of 100